This is a list of crime writers with a Wikipedia page. They may include the authors of any subgenre of crime fiction, including detective, mystery or hard-boiled. Some of these may overlap with the List of thriller authors.

Entries need an English Wikipedia page. Abbreviations: A = Australia, B = Belgium, C = Canada, Ch = China, E = England, F = France, G = Germany, Ic = Iceland, In = India, IoM = Isle of Man, Ir = Ireland, Is = Israel, It = Italy, J = Japan, Ma = Malta, Ne = Netherlands, NZ = N Zealand, P = Poland, R = Soviet Union/Russia, SA = S Africa, Sc = Scotland, Sw = Switzerland, T = Turkey, US = United States, W = Wales

A–B

Megan Abbott (born 1971, US)
Susan Wittig Albert (living, US)
Steve Allen (1921–2000, US)
Jirō Akagawa (赤川次郎, born 1948, J)
Boris Akunin (born 1956, R), pseudonym of Grigori Chkhartishvili
Margery Allingham (1904–1966, E)
Eric Ambler (1909–1998, E)
Sarah Andrews (died 2019, US)
Gosho Aoyama (青山剛昌, born 1963, J)
Charlotte Armstrong (1905–1969, US)
Jake Arnott (born 1961, E)
Gianluca Arrighi (born 1972, It)
Taku Ashibe (芦辺拓, born 1958, J)
Isaac Asimov (1920–1992, R/US)
Pieter Aspe (1953–2021, B)
H. C. Asterley (1902–1973, E)
Edward Atiyah (1903–1964, Lebanon)
Edward Attard (born 1947, Ma)
Yukito Ayatsuji (綾辻行人, born 1960, J), pseudonym of Naoyuki Uchida (内田直行)
Desmond Bagley (1923–1983, E)
H. C. Bailey (1878–1961, E)
Deb Baker (born 1953, US)
John Baker (born 1942, E)
Sharadindu Bandyopadhyay (1899–1970, In)
Ashok Banker (born 1964, In)
John Franklin Bardin (1916–1981, US)
Michael Bar-Zohar (born 1938, Is)
Burl Barer (born 1947, US)
Robert Barnard (1936–2013, E)
Nevada Barr (born 1952, US)
J. J. Barrie (born 1933, C)
Earle Basinsky (1923–1963, US)
G. D. Baum (living, US)
William Bayer (born 1939, US)
Simon Beckett (born 1960, E)
George Bellairs (1902–1982, E/IoM), pseudonym of Harold Blundell
Robert Leslie Bellem (1902–1968, US)
Edmund Clerihew Bentley (1875–1956, E)
Earl Derr Biggers (1884–1933, US)
Mark Billingham (born 1961, E)
Bimal Kar (1921–2003, In)
Robert Bloch (1917–1994, US)
Lawrence Block (born 1938, US)
Deborah Blum (born 1954, US)
Ernest Borneman (1915–1995, G/Austria)
Ernest Bramah (1868–1942, E)
Paolo Brera (1949–2019, It)
Simon Brett (born 1945, E)
P. J. Brooke (living, Sc), pseudonym of Philip James O'Brien
Fredric Brown (1906–1972, US)
Pat Brown (born 1955, US)
Ken Bruen (born 1951, Ir)
John Buchan (1875–1940, Sc)
John Bude (1901–1957, E), pseudonym of Ernest Elmore
James Lee Burke (born 1936, US)
Jan Burke (born 1953, US)

C

James M. Cain (1892–1977, US)
Paul Cain (1902–1966, US), pseudonym of George Caryl Sims
Bernard Capes (1854–1918, E)
John Dickson Carr (1906–1977, US)
Jane Casey (born 1977, Ir/E)
Kathryn Casey (living, US)
Rajorshi Chakraborti (born 1977, In)
Chan Ho-Kei (born 1975, 陳浩基, Hong Kong/Taiwan)
Jessie Chandler (born 1968, US)
Raymond Chandler (1988–1959, US/E)
Vikram Chandra (born 1961, In)
Kate Charles (born 1950, US/E)
Leslie Charteris (1907–1993, Singapore/E)
James Hadley Chase (1906–1985, E/Sw)
G. K. Chesterton (1874–1936, E)
Lee Child (born 1954, E), pseudonym of James Dover Grant
Chin Shunshin (陳舜臣, 1924–2015, Taiwan/J)
Agatha Christie (1890–1976, E)
Carol Higgins Clark (born 1956, US)
Mary Higgins Clark (1927–2020, US)
Paul Cleave (born 1974, NZ)
Brian Cleeve (1921–2003, E/Ir)
Ann Cleeves (born 1954, E)
Harlan Coben (born 1962, US)
Liza Cody (born 1944, E)
Max Allan Collins (born 1948, US)
Michael Collins (1924–2005), pseudonym of Dennis Lynds
Michael Connelly (born 1956, US)
Sheila Connolly (1950–2020, US)
Robin Cook (born 1940, US)
Patricia Cornwell (born 1956, US)
Anthony Berkeley Cox (1893–1971, E)
Chris Culver (living, US)
Philip R. Craig (1933–2007, US)
Robert Crais (born 1953, US)
John Creasey (1908–1973, E)
Michael Crichton (1942–2008, US)
Catherine Crier (born 1954, US)
Edmund Crispin (1921–1978, E), pseudonym of Robert Bruce Montgomery
Freeman Wills Crofts (1879–1957, Ir/E)
Amanda Cross (1926–2003, US), pseudonym of Carolyn Gold Heilbrun
James Crumley (1939–2008, US)

D–F

Jordan Dane (born 1953, US)
Diane Mott Davidson (born 1949, US)
Carol Anne Davis (born 1961, Sc)
Dorothy Salisbury Davis (1916–2014, US)
Janet Dawson (born 1949, US)
Jeffery Deaver (born 1950, US)
Vicki Delany (born 1951, C)
Lester Dent (1904–1959, US)
P. T. Deutermann (born 1941, US)
William Deverell (born 1937, C)
Colin Dexter (1930–2017, E)
Ranj Dhaliwal (born 1976/1977, C)
Michael Dibdin (1947–2007, E)
Eric Jerome Dickey (1961–2021, US)
Peter Dickinson (1927–2015, N Rhodesia/E)
S. S. Van Dine (1888–1939, US), pseudonym of Willard Huntington Wright
Doris Miles Disney (1907–1976, US)
Stacy Dittrich (born 1973, US)
Stephen Dobyns (born 1941, US)
R. B. Dominic (1927–1997 and born 1929, US), pseudonym of Mary Jane Latsis and Martha Henissart
Tim Dorsey (born 1961, US)
John E. Douglas (born 1945, US)
Arthur Conan Doyle (1859–1930, Sc/E)
John Dunning (1918–1990, US/Luxembourg)
Umberto Eco (1932–2016, It)
Edogawa Rampo (江戸川乱歩, 1894–1965, J), pseudonym of Tarō Hirai (平井太郎)
Martin Edwards (born 1955, E)
Åke Edwardson (born 1953, Sweden)
Mark Ellis (born 1953, W)
James Ellroy (born 1948, US)
Sven Elvestad (1884–1934, Norway)
Loren D. Estleman (born 1952, US)
Janet Evanovich (born 1943, US)
Stanley Evans (born 1931, C)
Diane Fanning (born 1950, US)
Charles Finch (born 1980, US)
Paul Finch (living, E)
Shamini Flint (born 1969, Malaya/Malaysia)
R. Barri Flowers (born 1956, US)
Pascale Fonteneau (born 1963, F/B)
Ron Franscell (born 1957, US)
Dick Francis (1920–2010, W/E)
Antonia Fraser (born 1932, E)
Kinky Friedman (born 1944, US)
Gayleen Froese (born 1972, C)
Jacques Futrelle (1875–1912, US)

G–H

Leighton Gage (1942–2013, US)
Erle Stanley Gardner (1889–1970, US)
Anthony Gilbert (1889–1973, E), pseudonym of Lucy Beatrice Malleson
Michael Gilbert (1912–2006, E)
Kenneth Giles (died 1974, E)
Steven Gore (living, US)
Ed Gorman (1941–2016, US)
Sue Grafton (1940–2017, US)
Caroline Graham (born 1931, E)
Ann Granger (born 1939, E)
Anna Katharine Green (1846–1935, US)
John M. Green (born 1953, A)
Graham Greene (1904–1991, E/Sw)
Bryan Gruley (born 1957, US)
Robert van Gulik (1910–1967, Ne/Dutch E Indies)
Elizabeth Gunn (living, US)
Batya Gur (1947–2005, Is)
Dashiell Hammett (1894–1961, US)
Cyril Hare (1900–1958, E), pseudonym of Alfred Alexander Gordon Clark
Kent Harrington (living, US)
Margie Harris (fl. 1930s, US)
Havank (1904–1964, Ne), pseudonym of Hendrikus Frederikus van der Kallen
Monika Hausammann (1974, CH)
Mo Hayder (1962–2021, E)
J. M. Hayes (living, US)
Elizabeth Haynes (living, E)
Tim Heald (1944–2016, E)
Peter Heck (born 1941, US)
Georgette Heyer (1902–1974, E)
Carl Hiaasen (born 1953, US)
Keigo Higashino (東野圭吾, born 1958, J)
George V. Higgins (1939–1999, US)
Patricia Highsmith (1921–1995, US/Sw)
Reginald Hill (1936–2012, E)
Tony Hillerman (1925–2008, US)
John Buxton Hilton (1921–1986, E)
Chester Himes (1909–1984, US/Spain)
Elisabeth Sanxay Holding (1889–1955, US)
Dorothy B. Hughes (1904–1993, US)
Victoria Houston (living, US)

I–L

Ibn-e-Safi (1928–1980, Pakistan)
Francis Iles (1893–1971, E), pseudonym of Anthony Berkeley Cox
Arnaldur Indriðason (born 1961, Ic)
Michael Innes (1906–1994, Sc), pseudonym of J. I. M. Stewart
Kōtarō Isaka (伊坂幸太郎, born 1971, J)
Ira Ishida (石田衣良, born 1960, J)
Shirley Jackson (1916–1965, US)
P. D. James (1920–2014, E)
Peter James (born 1948, E)
J. A. Jance (born 1944, US)
Quintin Jardine (born 1945, Sc)
Marshall Jevons (fl. 1970s, US), pseudonym of William L. Breit (1933–2011) and Kenneth G. Elzinga (living)
He Jiahong (何家弘, born 1953, Ch)
Alper Kaya (born 1990, T)
H. R. F. Keating (1926–2011, E)
Carolyn Keene (fl. 1970s–1980s, US), syndicate pseudonym
Faye Kellerman (born 1952, US)
Jonathan Kellerman (born 1949, US)
Harry Kemelman (1908–1996, US)
Michael Kenyon (1931–2005, E)
Simon Kernick (born 1967, E)
Kim Young-ha (김영하, born 1968, S Korea)
Laurie R. King (born 1952, US)
Natsuo Kirino (桐野夏生, born 1951, J)
Kenzo Kitakata (北方謙三, born 1947, J)
Kazuhiro Kiuchi (木内一裕, born 1960, J)
Andrew Klavan (born 1954, US)
Ronald Knox (1888–1957, E)
William Kent Krueger (born 1950, US)
Natsuhiko Kyōgoku (born 1963, J)
Lori L. Lake (born 1960, US)
Joe R. Lansdale (born 1951, US)
Shulamit Lapid (born 1934, Is)
Gaylord Larsen (born 1932, US)
Stieg Larsson (1954–2004, Sweden)
David Lassman (living, E)
Emma Lathen (fl. 1960s ff., US), pseudonym of Mary Jane Latsis (1927–1997) and Martha Henissart (born 1929)
Stephen Leather (born 1956, E)
John le Carré (1931–2020, E)
Vanessa Leggett (born 1968, US)
Dennis Lehane (born 1965, US)
Anthony Lejeune (1928-2018, E)
Donna Leon (born 1942, US/Sw)
Elmore Leonard (1925–2013, US)
Gaston Leroux (1868–1927, F)
Ira Levin (1929–2007, US)
Paul Levine (born 1948, US)
 Ted Lewis (1940–1982, E)
Laura Lippman (born 1959, US)
Steven Long (born 1944, US)
E. C. R. Lorac (1894–1958, E)
Gabrielle Lord (born 1946, A)
Gayle Lynds (living, US)

M

John D. MacDonald (1916–1986, US)
Ross Macdonald (1915–1983, US/C), pseudonym of Kenneth Millar
Shane Maloney (born 1953, A)
Henning Mankell (1948–2015, Sweden)
Petros Markaris (born 1937, T/US)
John Marquand (1893–1960, US)
Ngaio Marsh (1895–1982, NZ)
Faith Martin (living, E), pseudonym of Jacquie Walton
William Marshall (1944–2003, A)
Jan Mårtenson (born 1933, Sweden)
Edward Marston (born 1944, W/E), pseudonym of Keith Miles
Seichō Matsumoto (松本清張, 1909–1992, J)
Peter May (born 1951, Sc)
Ed McBain (1926–2005, US)
James McClure (1939–2006, SA/E)
Val McDermid (born 1955, Sc)
Dennis McDougal (born 1947, US)
Iain McDowall (living, Sc/E)
Michele McPhee (born 1970, US)
Clive Leo McNeir (living, E)
Lee Mellor (born 1982, E/C)
Nicholas Meyer (born 1945, US)
Milton Scott Michel (1916–1992, US)
Margaret Millar (1915–1994, C/US)
Zygmunt Miłoszewski (born 1976, P)
Denise Mina (born 1966, Sc)
Kanae Minato (湊かなえ, born 1973, J)
Dreda Say Mitchell (born 1965, E)
Gladys Mitchell (1901–1983, E)
Miyuki Miyabe (宮部みゆき, born 1960, J)
Gwen Moffat (born 1924, E)
Rick Mofina (living, C)
Christopher G. Moore (born 1952, C)
David Morrell (born 1943, C/US)
Mark Morris (born 1963, E)
John Mortimer (1923–2009, E)
Patricia Moyes (1923–2000, E)
Marcia Muller (born 1944, US)
Clare Munnings (living, US), pseudonym of Jill Ker Conway and Elizabeth Topham Kennan
Margaret Murphy (born 1959, E)
Susan Murphy-Milano (died 2012, US)

N–Q

Magdalen Nabb (1947–2007, E)
Fuminori Nakamura (中村文則, born 1977, J)
Jo Nesbø (born 1960, Norway)
Beverley Nichols (1898–1983, E)
Kyōtarō Nishimura (西村京太郎, 1930–2022, J)
Asa Nonami (乃南アサ, born 1960, J)
Jamyang Norbu (འཇམ་དབྱངས་ནོར་བུ, born 1949, Tibet/US)
Rintarō Norizuki (法月綸太郎, born 1964, J)
Joyce Carol Oates (born 1938, US)
Rodica Ojog-Brașoveanu (1939–2002, Romania)
Kidō Okamoto (岡本綺堂, 1872–1939, J)
Celil Oker (1952–2019, T)
Gō Ōsaka (逢坂剛, born 1943, J)
Arimasa Ōsawa (大沢在昌, born 1956, J)
Otsuichi (乙一, born 1978), pseudonym of Hirotaka Adachi (安達寛高)
Rodrigues Ottolengui (1861–1937, US)
Sara Paretsky (born 1947, US)
Edith Pargeter (1913–1995, E)
Robert B. Parker (1932–2010, US)
Surender Mohan Pathak (born 1940, In)
James Patterson (born 1947, US)
Hayford Peirce (1942–2020, US)
Don Pendleton (1927–1995, US)
Louise Penny (born 1958, C)
Anne Perry (born 1938, E)
Ellis Peters (1913–1995, E)
Mike Phillips (born 1941, British Guiana/E)
Scott Phillips (born 1961, US)
Edgar Allan Poe (1909–1949, US)
Nicholas A. Price (living, US)
Bill Pronzini (born 1943, US)
Lisa Pulitzer (born c. 1962, US)
Ellery Queen (1929 ff., US), pseudonym of Frederic Dannay and Manfred Bennington Lee

R–S

Melanie Raabe (born 1981, G)
Indra Soundar Rajan (born 1958, In)
Ian Rankin (born 1960, Sc)
Clayton Rawson (1906–1971, US)
Satyajit Ray (1921–1992, In)
Kathy Reichs (born 1948, US)
Ruth Rendell (1930–2015, E)
Osvaldo Reyes (born 1971, Panama)
Craig Rice (1908–1957, US)
Lynda Suzanne Robinson (born 1951, US)
Peter Robinson (born 1950, E/C)
Elliott Roosevelt (1910–1990, US)
Karen Rose (living, US)
Caitlin Rother (born 1962, C/US)
Hemendra Kumar Roy (1888–1963, In)
S. J. Rozan (born 1950, US)
Jane Rubino (living, US)
Ann Rule (1931–2015, US)
Craig Russell (living, Sc)
James Sallis (born 1944, US)
C. J. Sansom (born 1952, Sc)
Joh Sasaki (佐々木譲, born 1950, J)
Robin Sax (born 1972, US)
Dorothy L. Sayers (1893–1957, E)
Sandra Scoppettone (born 1936, US)
Cathy Scott (born 1950s, US)
Will Scott (1893–1964, E)
Lisa Scottoline (born 1955, US)
Sharadindu Bandyopadhyay, (1899–1970, In)
Sōji Shimada (島田荘司, born 1948, J)
John Silvester (living, A)
Georges Simenon (1903–1989, B)
Roger L. Simon (born 1943, US)
Dorothy Simpson (born 1933, E)
Elizabeth Sims (born 1957, US)
John Sladek (1937–2000, US)
Karin Slaughter (born 1971, US)
Aaron Smith (born 1976, US)
Alexander McCall Smith (born 1948, S Rhodesia/E)
Anthony Neil Smith (living US)
Joan Smith (born 1953, E)
Martin Cruz Smith (born 1942, US)
Teresa Solana (born 1962, Spain)
Mehmet Murat Somer (born 1959, T)
Julia Spencer-Fleming (born 1961, US)
Suzy Spencer (living, US)
Mickey Spillane (1918–2006, US)
Nancy Springer (born 1948, US)
Rex Stout (1886–1975, US)
Linda Stratmann (born 1948, E)
Cecil Street (1884–1964, Gibraltar/E), pseudonym John Rhode
Kalpana Swaminathan (born 1956, In)
Leonie Swann (born 1975, G)
Vikas Swarup (born 1960, In)
Mitzi Szereto (living, E)

T–Z

Akimitsu Takagi (高木彬光, 1920–1995, J)
Katsuhiko Takahashi (高橋克彦, born 1947, J)
Kazuaki Takano (高野和明, born 1964, J)
Tetsuo Takashima (高嶋哲夫, born 1949, J)
Andrew Taylor (born 1951, E)
Josephine Tey (1896–1952, Sc/E), pseudonym of Elizabeth MacKintosh
Johan Theorin (born 1963, Sweden)
Paul and Mabel Thorne (early 20th c., US)
Masako Togawa (戸川昌子, 1931–2016, J)
M. J. Trow (born 1949, W/E)
Margaret Truman (1924–2008, US)
James Twining (born 1972, E)
Ahmet Ümit (born 1960, T)
Lisa Unger (born 1970, US)
Arthur Upfield (1890–1964, E/A)
Andrew Vachss (1942–2021, US)
Edgar Wallace (1875–1932, E/US)
Lew Wallace (1827–1905, US)
Minette Walters (born 1949, E)
Wang Shuo (王朔, born 1958, Ch)
Sarah Ward (living, E)
Hillary Waugh (1920–2008, US)
Betty Webb (living, US)
Charlie Wells (1923–2004, US)
Jeri Westerson (born 1960, US)
Donald E. Westlake (1933–2008, US)
Patricia Wentworth (1877–1961, E)
Janwillem van de Wetering (1931–2008, Ne)
Ethel Lina White (1876–1944, E)
Collin Wilcox (1924–1996, US)
Charles Willeford (1919–1998, US)
Leslie Wolfe (born 1967, US)
Cornell Woolrich (1903–1968, US)
Dornford Yates (1885–1960, E/S Rhodesia), pseudonym of Cecil William Mercer
Seishi Yokomizo (横溝正史, 1902–1981, J)
Hideo Yokoyama (横山秀夫, born 1957, J)
Shuichi Yoshida (吉田修一, born 1968, J)
Yumeno Kyūsaku (夢野久作, 1889–1936, J)
Helen Zahavi (born 1966, E)

See also
List of Australian crime-related books and media
Lists of authors
List of mystery writers
List of thriller authors
List of Asian crime fiction writers
Detective fiction
Crime fiction
Mystery fiction
The Top 100 Crime Novels of All Time
Whodunit

Crime-related lists
Lists of writers